Otto Seitz, was a 19th-century German painter; born 3 September 1846 in Munich.  As a professor with the Academy of Fine Arts, Munich, he was the mentor of many major artists.

Works
His primary subjects were genre scenes,  floral still life and landscapes.
in works with titles such as: 
"Boozers and Ruffians in a Rural Tavern" 
"Old Farmer at the Table with a Beer Bottle" 
"Street Musicians in the Backyard,"  
"Young Waitress"
Woodland and Rocks"
The Wedding Procession of Neptune and Amphitrite"
The Love Letter"
"Portrait of a Young Italian Woman"

Some of his most famous works are small, sometimes even miniatures, for example, his "Faun and Nymph" (oil on wood) has the dimensions 9 cm x 8 cm (3.5 x 3.1 inches) and "Landscapes" (watercolor / pencil on wood) had lateral dimensions of approximately 2 cm. (not quite 1 inch). 
 
He died March 13, 1912, and was buried in the Old South Cemetery in Munich.

References

External links

Academy of Fine Arts, Munich alumni
Academic staff of the Academy of Fine Arts, Munich
Artists from Munich
19th-century German painters
19th-century German male artists
German male painters
20th-century German painters
20th-century German male artists
1846 births
1912 deaths